Lucas Fernández de Piedrahita (1624, Bogotá – March 29, 1688) was a Spanish Neogranadine Roman Catholic prelate who served as the Bishop of Panamá (1676–1688)
and the Bishop of Santa Marta (1668–1676).

Biography 
Lucas Fernández de Soto Piedrahita was born in Santa Fe de Bogotá as son of Domingo Hernández de Soto Piedrahita and Catalina de Collantes. He had one brother and two sisters: Gregorio Hernández de Collantes, María Sayago and Maria Fernández de Piedrahita and his mother was of Inca descent. On February 27, 1668, he was appointed by the King of Spain and confirmed by Pope Clement IX as Bishop of Santa Marta. In 1669, he was consecrated bishop by Antonio Sanz Lozano, Bishop of Cartagena. On November 16, 1676, he was appointed by the King of Spain and confirmed by Pope Innocent XI as Bishop of Panamá. He served as Bishop of Panamá until his death on March 29, 1688. He was the principal consecrator of Sancho de Andrade de Figueroa, Bishop of Ayacucho o Huamanga.

Muisca 
Fernández de Piedrahita has contributed extensively on the knowledge about the Muisca, the inhabitants of Altiplano Cundiboyacense before the arrival of the Spanish.

See also 
List of Muisca scholars

References

External links and additional sources
 (for Chronology of Bishops) 
 (for Chronology of Bishops) 
 (for Chronology of Bishops) 
 (for Chronology of Bishops) 

1624 births
1688 deaths
Bishops appointed by Pope Clement IX
Bishops appointed by Pope Innocent XI
Muisca scholars
Colombian people of indigenous peoples descent
17th-century Roman Catholic bishops in Panama
Roman Catholic bishops of Panamá
Roman Catholic bishops of Santa Marta